Mayländer is a surname. Notable people with the surname include:

Bernd Mayländer (born 1971), German racing driver
Karl Mayländer (1872–early 1940s), Austrian Jewish businessman and art collector murdered in the Holocaust

German-language surnames